DYPJ (100.1 FM) Jagna Community Radio is a radio station owned and operated by the Government of Jagna through its Community Radio Council. The station's studio and transmitter are located in Brgy. Poblacion, Jagna, Bohol.

References

Radio stations established in 2008
Radio stations in Bohol